Roseau River Anishinabe First Nation (Ojibwe: Okwewanashko-ziibiing, meaning: "Rag Weed River") is a First Nation in southern Manitoba, Canada, situated around the Roseau River.  

Its main reserve is Roseau River No. 2.

History
The people of Roseau River Anishinabe First Nation have a long history in the area of the Pembina and Red River Valleys in Manitoba, Minnesota, and North Dakota. The Roseau River people had a long history with a clan system which assigned different responsibilities to various clans and societies.  Collectively, the Anishinabe (Ojibway) of Manitoba, Western Ontario, North Dakota and Northern Minnesota  were known in Ojibwe as the Zoong-gi-dah Anishinabe.

With the arrival of Europeans in the area, they were first called the Pembina Band due to their location in the Pembina Valley. However, as more and more settlers arrived and pushed the people away from their original lands to hunt they gradually abandoned these lands. Eventually with the signing of Treaty 1 on 3 August 1871, a grouping was given the peoples around the Roseau River where the community is now located. 

The community had to be evacuated in 1997, 2009, and 2011 as a result of flooding which cut off road access to the community. The community is protected by a ring dike which has prevented large inundation of the community during these floods.

Reserve lands
It has a registered population of 2,152 individuals. 

The First Nation has three reserves: 

 Roseau River No. 2 — the First Nation's main reserve. As of the 2011 Census, this reserve's official population was 588 inhabitants. 
As of the 2011 Census, this reserve's official population was 107 inhabitants. 
Not having its own Canadian census subdivision, this reserve is enumerated as part of the Rural Municipality of Rosser; as such, this reserve's population is not individually reported. 

Leadership
Roseau River Anishinabe First Nation is a member of the Dakota Ojibway Tribal Council.  The current Chief and Council are: Chief Gary Roberts; Councillor Terrance Nelson, Councillor Evan Roberts, Councillor Jason Henry and Councillor Rachel Seenie.

Notable people
Shingoose,  musician

See also 
 First Nations in Manitoba

References 

 First Nation profile by the Government of Canada's Department of Indian and Northern Affairs
 Map of Roseau River 2 at Statcan
 Map of Roseau Rapids 2A at Statcan
 Bruce Cherney, Roseau River Land Surrender (Parts One, Two, and Three)

Dakota Ojibway Tribal Council
First Nations in Southern Manitoba
First Nations governments in Manitoba